"I Say Good-bye" is a song written by Akinori Nakagawa and the theme song of the Japanese TV drama Saigo no Kazoku.

Track listing

References

External links
Official Discography 
JBook data 

Akinori Nakagawa songs
2001 singles
Japanese television drama theme songs
2001 songs
Songs written by Akinori Nakagawa